Richard Eugene Vatz (born December 21, 1946) is an American academic, lecturer and writer who is a professor of Rhetoric and Communication at Towson University.

Vatz is a Faculty Fellow at the Eastern Communication Association (ECA) and has been honored by the National Communication Association (NCA). 

Vatz has been member of the Towson Board of Trustees for several years and an associate psychology editor for USA Today magazine since 1987.  He has been a member of the National Communication Association since 1969.

Vatz wrote The Only Authentic Book of Persuasion: the Agenda-Spin Model, (McGraw-Hill, 2017), and he is co-editor of Thomas Szasz:  The Man and His Ideas (Transaction Books, 2017). He has also published articles, reviews and lectures on the preeminence of rhetorical study, political rhetoric, rhetoric and psychiatry and media criticism.  

Vatz has spoken at Hillsdale College and the University of Richmond . He has taught a course called "Persuasion".

He is married to Joanne Pychock Vatz; the couple have two children and one grandchild.

Awards and honors
 President's Award for Distinguished Service, 2004, Towson University
 Maryland "Governor’s Citation" for Achievements in Higher Education and Service to Towson University, 2004
 The Thomas Szasz Civil Liberties Award January, 1994
 Winner,  Teaching Fellow Award, Eastern Communication Association, 2004
 Keynote Speaker and award-winner at first "Towson's Elite" Night, 2004
 Towson University Faculty Volunteer Service Award, 2003
 "Teacher of the Year," 2002, Towson University, awarded by the Student Government Association
 University Merit Award 1984, 1988, 1990 (awarded to 30 faculty each year 1983-1990)
 Won 1977, 1978, 1979, 1980 –  Outstanding Teaching Grants (awarded to ten of approximately 500 full-time faculty each year 1976-1980); most of such awards on faculty
 Appointed to Faculty of Honors College, Towson State University, 1982

Selected Lecturing Activity
 Windham Fellow Lecture Series in Liberal Arts, "Rhetoric and Impeachment," Middle Tennessee State University, March 4, 1999
 Maryland Governor Bob Ehrlich's addresses to Vatz's "Persuasion" class at Towson twice a year 1993–2022, ending with Vatz's Retirement
 Moderated debates for U.S. House of Representatives election: 2004; Dutch Ruppersberger in 2006 for his attempt to win a Congressional seat and Ruppersberger vs. Helen Bentley for their House race, September 24, 2002.  Vatz moderated a debate between state senate candidates Jim Brochin and Martha Klima, 2002
 Featured speaker honoring Dr. Thomas Szasz on his 80th birthday; symposium was titled "Liberty and/or Psychiatry: 40 Years After 'The Myth of Mental Illness,'" April 15, 2000
 Highlight Article on Vatz's public commentary: Vatz's Election Commentary, Towson Times, October 23, 2002  
 Subject of article in The Washington Post, May 6, 2004 on Gov. Robert L. Ehrlich's lectureships to his Persuasion class, 1993-2004
He has been a member of his Towson University University Senate for a record 38 (current term ends in 2020) years.

Some Research Highlights  
 Panel presented on Vatz's work at NCA convention, "Richard E. Vatz on Rhetoric and Psychiatry," 1999  
 Named as a  major rhetorical theorist in an essay on "The Rhetorical Situation" in Twentieth-Century Roots of Rhetorical Studies and in essay on "Rhetorical Theory as Message Reception" in Spring, 2003 Communication Studies  
 Appointed Lifetime Member of Board of Trustees,
 Chosen by NCA Vice President to participate in a debate on President Bush's policies on Iraq for NCA national convention, 2002
 Ad Watch Critic, WBAL Radio, September–November 2002: Printed Analysis of Campaign Ads in 2002 Campaigns
 Short bio feature, "No Rhetoric Here," Baltimore Jewish Times, January 9, 2004  p. 8

Works
During the 1970s, Vatz published the article, "The Myth of the Rhetorical Situation," in the journal Philosophy and Rhetoric. In it, he critiqued Lloyd Bitzer's 1968 article "The Rhetorical Situation" in the same journal and this has served as the basis for his world view on persuasion; namely, that rhetorical study is conceived most advantageously for the field through a model of competition for agenda and spin, not as controlled by some objective view of reality. Vatz maintains that the latter view makes rhetorical study simply a copy and mouthpiece of other social sciences, fields that are anti-rhetorical.

In January 2009, Vatz published a follow-up piece to the "Myth" article in the NCA's January, 2009, Review of Communication. The article was titled "The Mythical Status of Situational Rhetoric: Implications for Rhetorical Critics’ Relevance in the Public Arena." Vatz argued there that the "Myth" perspective was the appropriate rhetorical approach to the study of persuasion. In contrast, the perspective offered in "The Rhetorical Situation" was anathema to the academic status of rhetorical study, as it implied that situations caused the production of rhetoric rather than high-ethos rhetoricians' choices.  This caused what audiences perceived as dominant situations and their meaning.

In 2012, Vatz published The Only Authentic Book of Persuasion: the Agenda-Spin Model and a new co-edited book Thomas Szasz:  The Man and His Ideas and others. He has also published articles on political rhetoric and media criticism in The Wall Street Journal, The Washington Post, The Washington Times and The Los Angeles Times.  Vatz has presented hundreds of convention papers and panels at the National Communication Association and Eastern Communication Association (ECA), the SSCA, and elsewhere, including regular analyses of political rhetoric in seminars at the NCA with progressive colleagues.

Media appearances 
Vatz has appeared on CNN’s Crossfire, Larry King Live, The Phil Donahue Show, and William F. Buckley's Firing Line.  He appeared for over forty years as a guest on WBAL Radio in Baltimore. He has recently appeared on Fox television in Baltimore and Washington.

He has also appeared frequently on WBFF-TV, WMAR-TV, primarily on their talk show "Square Off" hosted by Richard Sher, Maryland Public Television, WJZ-TV, and WBAL-TV.

Over his career Vatz published in The Washington Post, The Baltimore Sun, The Los Angeles Times and multiple other publications; he wrote and writes on conservative perspectives generally.

Vatz was a blogger for Red Maryland and blogged several pieces a year on national conservative perspectives on rhetorical theory, media criticism and contemporary political issues.

References

External links 
The Myth of the Rhetorical Situation
The Mythical Status of Situational Rhetoric
archived version of The Mythical Status of Situational Rhetoric 

Living people
1947 births
Towson University faculty